Sirsa Lok Sabha constituency is one of the 10 Lok Sabha (parliamentary) constituencies in Haryana state in northern India. This constituency covers the entire Sirsa and Fatehabad districts and part of Jind district of the state. It is reserved for the Scheduled caste candidates since its inception in 1967.

Assembly segments
At present, Sirsa Lok Sabha constituency comprises nine Vidhan Sabha (legislative assembly) constituencies. These are:

Members of Parliament

1952-61: Constituency does not exist

^ by poll

Election Results

General Election 2019

General Election 2014

General Election 2009

See also
 Sirsa district
 List of Constituencies of the Lok Sabha

References 

Lok Sabha constituencies in Haryana
Sirsa district